Jiaxing Catholic Church is a Roman Catholic Church in downtown Jiaxing, Zhejiang, China.

History
Jiaxing Catholic Church was originally built by French priest Bu Shijia in 1902, under the Qing dynasty (1644–1911). It was the headquarters of Carmelites in Jiaxing. Construction of the current church, designed by Italian priest Han Rilu, commenced in 1917 and was completed in 1930. During the Cultural Revolution, the Red Guards attacked the church and part of it was badly damaged. In March 2005, it was designated as a "Historical and Cultural Site Protected at the Provincial Level" by  the Zhejiang government. In May 2013, it was listed among the seventh batch of "Major National Historical and Cultural Sites in Zhejiang" alongside Jiaxing Vincent Abbey by the State Council of China. The restoration of the church will begin in November 2019 and is expected to be completed in December 2020.

References

Further reading
 
 

Churches in Zhejiang
Tourist attractions in Jiaxing
Roman Catholic churches in China
1930 establishments in China
20th-century Roman Catholic church buildings in China
Roman Catholic churches completed in 1930
Major National Historical and Cultural Sites in Zhejiang